Murasaki is the main character in The Tale of Genji.

Murasaki may also refer to:

People
 Murasaki Shikibu, author of The Tale of Genji
 Murasaki Yamada, Japanese feminist essayist, manga artist, and poet
 Murasaki Fujima, Japanese actress

Fictional characters
 Lady Murasaki, a character from Tom Harris's Hannibal Rising
 Murasaki Kimidori, a character from the anime and manga series Dr. Slump
 Ninja Murasaki, a member of the Red Ribbon Army in the anime and manga series Dragon Ball
 Murasaki Kuhōin, a character from the light novel, anime and manga series

Books
 The Murasaki Shikibu Diary, diary written by Murasaki Shikibu
 Murasaki (novel), a 1992 science fiction novel by several authors, edited by Robert Silverberg

Colours and dyes
, the outerwear color of 1st rank aristocrats in the forbidden colors system of the Japanese Imperial Court from the 10th–11th century until the Meiji period (1867–1911)
 The Japanese word for Lithospermum erythrorhizon (purple gromwell) or the dye or made from its root

Other uses
 Murasaki (crater), a crater on planet Mercury, named after Murasaki Shikibu
 A station on the Nishitetsu Tenjin Ōmuta Line
 Murasaki 312, a fictional space phenomenon in Star Trek: The Original Series.

Japanese feminine given names